Eugenics was practiced in about 33 different states. Oregon was one of the many states that implemented eugenics programs and laws. This affected a number of different groups that were marginalized for being "unfit" and often were subject to forced sterilization.

Background 
Eugenics is the belief and practice of controlling the population's genetic quality by restricting people who were deemed "unfit" to reproduce. Eugenics was not a new idea, but Francis Galton, the half cousin of Charles Darwin, coined the term in 1883. Galton took Charles Darwin's theory of evolution and selective breeding and applied it to humans. In the United States, eugenics became popular in the 19th century, but after the first World War it fell in popularity.

Oregon history

Portland Vice Scandal
On November 8, 1912, Benjamin Trout was arrested for a petty crime and during his interrogation he told the Portland Police about homosexual activity that was going on in the area. After the news broke, it became the main focus of the newspaper, not just locally but also nationally.

The government took this scandal seriously, even the Federal Authorities got involved. There were as many as fifty people who were incriminated for crimes relating to the scandal but many charges were dropped due to the lack of evidence. Some of the people who were suspected of sex related crimes were people who came from reputable backgrounds who roomed at the YMCA. The YMCA was known for being supported by the "better classes" causing backlash against the YMCA, similar businesses, and the wealthy for being a cause for the "immorality" that was happening in the city.

The newspaper covered this story for a few weeks but it impacted history for many years. Schools reinforced heterosexual teachings when it came to sex education. It affected much of the northwest to change sodomy laws so that the maximum sentence increased from five years to fifteen years and included "... other gross, bestial and perverted sexual habits". This scandal primarily influenced Oregon, Washington, and Idaho to start eugenic programs. The eugenic programs also became more focused towards sex offenders because of this scandal.

Being considered a sex offender included:

 Contributing to the delinquency of a minor    
 Crimes against nature    
 Homosexuality     
 Indecent and immoral acts    
 Oral sex    
 Sodomy

Sterilization bill passes 
One of Oregon's first female physicians, Bethenia Angelina Owens-Adair, helped write and promote the first bill to create the Oregon Board of Eugenics in 1909. It was initially rejected by Governor George Chamberlain but in 1913, Governor Oswald West approved the second bill that was introduced. Governor Oswald was one of the many supporters for eugenics specifically when it pertained to sex offenders and was more driven to make the bill a reality because of the Portland Vice Scandal. Even though it did pass it did not last for very long because the Anti-Sterilization League, led by Lora Cornelia Little, was able to get a referendum which appealed the Oregon Sterilization Act of 1913 for a few years. Later in 1917 the bill was reintroduced and signed into law and by this time Lora Cornelia Little had moved on from the Anti-Sterilization League. The Anti-Sterilization League tried to get another referendum but it failed which lead to the Oregon Board of Eugenics being established. In 1919 the law was amended to include an appeal process for patients.

Eugenic practices and beliefs

The affected and the effects 
Freeman, Josh. "Anti-Sterilization League." The Oregon Encyclopedia, 17 Mar. 2018 stated: Compulsory human sterilization laws originated in America during the last half of the 19th century, driven primarily by politically active physicians interested in shaping the population to exclude undesirable demographics—such as criminals, the mentally ill, epileptics, and gays and lesbians—in a movement called eugenics.Forced sterilization was a large part of the eugenics movement. They targeted mostly people who were mentally ill, homosexual, criminal, or people in poverty. Basically the idea was to improve the population for the better. People saw wealth, good morals, good mental health, and heterosexuality as good factors for marriage and to create children. Much of this was not scientifically backed up.
Lawrence, Cera R., "Oregon State Board of Eugenics". Embryo Project Encyclopedia (2013-04-22). ISSN: 1940-5030 During the 1970s, many male and female teenagers at homes for wayward teens, such as Fairview Hospital and Training Center in Salem, were injected with sedatives and sterilized against their will. In the court case Nancy Rae Cook v. State of Oregon (1972), 17-year-old Nancy Rae Cook appealed the Board of Social Protection's ruling that she be sterilized due to mental illness resulting from childhood physical and sexual abuse. The people who fell outside what was considered "fit" were forced to undergo sterilization, permanently leaving them unable to reproduce.

Better Babies
In Oregon, better baby competitions started appearing especially at the State Fair they were done to determine which baby was the "better baby" from all the contestants that entered. This was done by checking their mental health, weighing them, and measuring their body proportions. Winning babies received cash prizes and were published in the newspapers. These competitions also promoted the idea that people should be more careful of whom they decide to marry and procreate with. The other proponent was to decrease baby mortality rates.

Forced sterilization ended
In 1921 the 1917 statute was ruled unconstitutional by the Circuit Court of Marion County and then in 1921 a new law was signed and passed to bring back eugenics to Oregon. The Board of Eugenics revised their practices but even so there was not any real change. After the Civil Rights Movement and the first World War, The Board of Eugenics became the Board of Social Protection in 1967. The last recorded forced sterilization was in 1981 and in 1983 the Oregon State Senate finally abolished the statute and the board.

Oregon sterilized 2,648 people under its eugenics law.

Apology 
In December 2002, Governor John Kitzhaber formally apologized for the forced sterilization that occurred in Oregon and then made December 10 Human Rights Day in Oregon.

References

External links 
 Anti-Sterilization League
 Better Babies

Eugenics in the United States
LGBT in Oregon